May is the fifth month of the year.

May, MAY or may might also refer to:

Arts and entertainment
 May (film), a 2002 drama/horror film
 May (painting), a series of 1718th-century paintings
 Máj, a 1836 poem by Karel Hynek Mácha
 "May" (song), a 2000 song by B'z

Persons and fictional characters
 May (given name), including a list of people and fictional characters with the name
 May (surname), including a list of people with the surname
 May (actress), Burmese actress, singer and model (born 1991)
 May (singer), South Korean singer (born 1982)
 May (governor), ancient Egyptian official under Pharaoh Thutmose III
 May (noble), ancient Egyptian official under Pharaoh Akhenaten

Places

United States 
 May, California, a former settlement 
 May, Idaho, an unincorporated community
 May, Missouri, an unincorporated community
 May, Oklahoma, a small town
 May, Texas, an unincorporated community
 May, West Virginia, an unincorporated community
 May Township (disambiguation)

Elsewhere 
 May, Russia, several rural localities in Russia
 Isle of May, Scotland
 May District, Kazakhstan, Pavlodar Region
 May district, Laos, Phongsaly Province
 Cape May (disambiguation)
 348 May, an asteroid

Transportation
 Maybole railway station, Scotland, National Rail station code MAY
 Maysville station, Kentucky, United States, Amtrak station code MAY
 Clarence A. Bain Airport, Mangrove Cay, Bahamas, airport code MAY

Other uses
 Baron May, a title in the Peerage of the United Kingdom
 may, an English modal verb
 May people, an ethnic group of Vietnam
 May language, a language spoken by the May people of Vietnam
 Ilyushin Il-38, a Soviet and Russian plane with the NATO reporting name May
 May (spider), a genus of African huntsman spiders
 Maythorn, or hawthorn, a species of plant
 May Company (disambiguation)

See also